Speedy Meade is a 1919 American silent Western film directed by Ira M. Lowry and starring Louis Bennison, Katherine MacDonald, Neil Moran, Claire Adams, and Norman Jefferies. The film was released by Goldwyn Pictures on March 23, 1919.

Plot

Cast
 Louis Bennison as Speedy Meade
 Katherine MacDonald as Mary Dillman
 Neil Moran as Robert Bridges
 Claire Adams as Alice Hall
 Norman Jefferies as Bud Lester
 Edward Roseman as Buck Lennon
 Ricca Allen as Mrs. Buck Lennon
 William Bailey as Cal Merchant

Preservation
The film is now considered lost.

References

External links
 

1919 films
1919 Western (genre) films
American black-and-white films
Goldwyn Pictures films
Lost American films
Silent American Western (genre) films
1910s American films
1910s English-language films